Victoria class may refer to:

 Victoria-class submarine
 Victoria-class battleship
 GWR Victoria Class steam locomotive